Jack Fry is an American businessman, former firefighter and Republican politician He served as Midwest City Mayor, and holds a seat in the Oklahoma State Senate. Fry was first elected mayor of Midwest City in 2010 and re-elected without opposition in 2014, won the District 42 senate seat vacated by term-limited Cliff Aldridge. He is the primary sponsor of 49 bills.

State senate 
Elections for the office of Oklahoma State Senate took place in 2014. A primary election took place on June 24, 2014. The general election was held on November 4, 2014.  Jack Fry defeated Greg Childers in the Republican primary, while Hiawatha N. Bouldin, Jr. was unopposed in the Democratic primary and Charles Thompson as the independent candidate. Fry defeated Bouldin and Thompson in the general election.

2017 legislative session 
At the beginning of the 2017 legislative session, this legislator served on the following committees:

References 

 Midwest City sets election date to replace former mayor, who was elected to the Senate 2014-12-04. Retrieved November 9, 2018.
 Ballotpedia-Jack Fry Retrieved November 9, 2018.
 Senator Jack Fry - District 42. Retrieved November 9, 2018.
 Jack Fry- Republican — Senator — District 42. Retrieved November 9, 2018.

Living people
Republican Party Oklahoma state senators
Mayors of places in Oklahoma
Year of birth missing (living people)